Stewart D. Friedman is a professor at the Wharton School of Business at the University of Pennsylvania and the founding director of the Wharton Leadership Program and Wharton's Work/Life Integration Project. He has been on the Wharton faculty since 1984 and became the Management Department's first Practice Professor in recognition of his work within the fields of Leadership Development, Human Resources and Work–Life Integration on the application theory and research on the real challenges facing organizations. In 2001, Friedman completed a two-year assignment as the director of the Leadership Development Center at Ford Motor Company, where he ran a 50-person, $25 million operation.

Friedman has published numerous books and articles on work/life integration, leadership, and the dynamics of change.  He also regularly tweets about these topics on his Twitter account, @StewFriedman.

Education and early life 
Friedman holds a B.A. in Psychology from S.U.N.Y. Binghamton and an M.A. in Psychology and Ph.D. in Organizational Psychology from the University of Michigan.

Career 
Friedman has consulted a wide range of organizations, executives, and distinguished individuals, including Jack Welch, former Vice President Al Gore, two White House administrations, the United Nations, the U.S. Department of Labor, the U.S. Department of State, and the U.S. Army. He serves on numerous advisory boards and conducts workshops globally on leadership and "the whole person," change creation, and strategic human resources issues. The recipient of numerous teaching awards, he appears regularly in business media, and The New York Times cited the "rock star adoration" he inspires in his students.

Friedman hosts a weekly radio show, Work and Life, on Sirius XM 132, Business Radio Powered by the Wharton School.

Works 
His most recent book, Leading The Life You Want: Skills for Integrating Work and Life, is a Wall Street Best Seller.  His book, Total Leadership: Be a Better Leader, Have a Richer Life, was published in June 2008 by Harvard Business Press. The book has been on the USA Today bestseller book list and won several other book awards. It has sold over 70,000 copies in the US and has been translated into Chinese, Japanese, Korean, Polish, Portuguese, Russian, and Spanish.  In 2013 he wrote, Baby Bust: New Choices for Men and Women in Work and Family (Wharton Press).  Friedman's book Work and Family—Allies or Enemies? (which he co-authored with Jeff Greenhaus) was recognized by The Wall Street Journal as one of the field's best books. In April 2011, Leadership Succession, which Friedman edited, was reissued in paperback by Transaction Publishers after being in print for 25 years.

Total Leadership 

In Friedman's most recent book, Total Leadership: Be a Better Leader, Have a Richer Life, Friedman argues that leadership in business cannot be merely about business anymore: it has to be about life as a whole. Total Leadership is an approach to human resource management and leadership development created and tested at Ford and The Wharton School of the University of Pennsylvania that suggests that leadership must be embodied at all levels of an organizational culture to create sustainable change that’s beyond work-life balance that is good for work, family, community, and self (mind, body, and spirit).

This approach, Friedman writes, is superior at integrating work and the rest of life, preferable to the pursuit of “balance,” which erroneously assumes the necessity of tradeoffs.  With “four-way wins,” all parties benefit.  From this perspective, individuals realize that their actions as leaders serve a larger purpose, making the world  better.  They feel part of something bigger than their own lives, and thereby find greater meaning in what they do. The approach has been used in non-profits as well as major for-profit corporations in the United States, Canada, Europe, Central America, and South America to increase organizational and individual productivity by decreasing stress, turnover, and absenteeism by capitalizing on one's personal life interests and priorities. Total Leadership is a primary intervention in a multi-year study funded by the National Institute of Health.

Friedman presents Total Leadership as a proven method to achieving four-way wins. It is based upon following these principles using stakeholder interviews for 360 degree feedback:

1. Be Real: Act with authenticity by clarifying what’s important.

2. Be Whole: Act with integrity by respecting the whole person.

3. Be Innovative: Act with creativity by continually experimenting.

Bibliography 

 Leading the Life You Want: Skills for Integrating Work and Life, published by Harvard Business Press in 2014.
 Leadership Succession, published by Transaction Publishers in 2011.
 Total Leadership: Be a Better Leader, Have a Richer Life, published by Harvard Business School Press in 2008.
 Work and Family—Allies or Enemies?, published by the Oxford University Press in 2000.
 Integrating Work and Life: The Wharton Resource Guide, published in 1998.
 Friedman, S. D. and Lobel, S., 2003.  The Happy Workaholic: a role model for employees.  Academy of Management Executive, 17 (3): 87-98.
 Friedman, S. D., Christensen, P. and DeGroot, J., 1998. Work and life: the end of the zero-sum game.  Harvard Business Review, Nov-Dec, 119-129.  Reprinted as lead article in Harvard Business Review on work and life balance.  Boston:  Harvard Business School Press, 2000.   Also reprinted in Leading through adversity (HBR OnPoint Collection), 2002.
 Robertson, T., 2005.  Between work and life there’s balance.  Boston Globe, June 19.
 Hammonds, K. H., 2000. "Grassroots Leadership - Ford Motor Co. Fast Company, April.

Awards and recognitions 
Friedman was awarded the Families and Work Institute's Legacy Award in 2013.  He was chosen by Working Mother as one of "America's 25 most influential men for having made things better for working parents," was selected twice by HR Magazine as  Most Influential Thinker and by Thinkers 50 thrice as one of the "world's top 50 business thinkers."

In 2015 he won the Thinkers 50 Distinguished Achievement Award in Talent. Friedman writes about work-life integration, leadership, and other topics as a Harvard Business Review blogger.

 Thinkers 50 in 2011 ("the definitive global ranking of management thinkers") 
 Excellence in Teaching Award: Core Curriculum in 2011 (University of Pennsylvania) 
 Winner of the CEO READ Best Business Book Award 2008 - Personal Development 
 One of Working Mother's 25 most influential men in 2007 for "having made things better for working parents" 
 William Whitney Teaching Award in 2007 
 MBA Core Curriculum Teaching Award in 1996 (University of Pennsylvania) 
 Outstanding Teaching Award in 1993 (University of Pennsylvania Undergraduate Evening School) 
 Outstanding Teaching Award in 1990 (University of Pennsylvania Undergraduate Division)

References

External links 

 
 Official Wharton profile
 Harvard Business Review blog profile
 Total Leadership book on Goodreads
 Leading@google: Stew Friedman speaks at Google (video)
 Wharton Work/Life Integration Project website
 Thinkers 50 profile ("the definitive global ranking of management thinkers")
 "A Life in Harmony" Friedman article in Chief Executive Officer
 New York Times profile
 HR Management profile
 ABC News interview with Friedman (video)
 Harvard Business Review interview with Friedman (podcast)
 Washington Post interview with Friedman
 Tim Ferris interview with Friedman
 Sloan Work and Family interview with Friedman
 "Living with a Blackberry Addict" article mention in Inc
 "Preparing the Leaders of Tomorrow" article mention in the Jewish Exponent

University of Pennsylvania faculty
Year of birth missing (living people)
Living people
University of Michigan alumni